Ganson is both a surname and a given name. Notable people with the name include:

Surname:
Arthur Ganson (born 1955), American sculptor
John Ganson (1818–1874), American lawyer and politician
Josh Ganson (born 1998), English rugby league player
Lewis Ganson (1913–1980), English magician
Steve Ganson (born 1970), English rugby league referee

Given name:
Ganson Purcell, American government official

English-language surnames
English-language given names